Juan Gutiérrez may refer to:

Juanito (footballer, born 1980) (Juan Jesús Gutierrez), Spanish footballer who currently plays for UD Almería
Juan Gutiérrez (baseball) (born 1983), Venezuelan baseball player who currently plays for the San Francisco Giants
Juan Gutiérrez (bishop) (1578–1649), Roman Catholic prelate who served as Bishop of Vigevano
Juan Pedro Gutiérrez (born 1983), Argentinian basketball player who currently plays for CB Gran Canaria
Juan Gutiérrez de Padilla (c. 1590–1664), composer
Juan Gutiérrez (footballer, born 1964) (born 1964), Chilean football forward
Juan Gutiérrez (footballer, born 1990) (born 1990), Chilean football midfielder
Juan B. Gutiérrez (born 1973), American mathematician and author
Juan Diego Gutiérrez (born 1992), Peruvian footballer
Juan José Gutiérrez Mayorga (born 1958), Guatemalan businessman
Juan María Gutiérrez (1809–1878), Argentine statesman, jurist, surveyor, historian, critic, and poet
Juan Simón Gutiérrez (1634–1718), Spanish Baroque painter
Juan Jesús Gutiérrez (sprinter) (born 1969), Mexican sprinter
Juan Jesús Gutiérrez Cuevas (born 1969), Spanish cross country skier 
Juanito (footballer, born 1976) (Juan Gutiérrez Moreno), Spanish footballer